Rajya Sabha elections were held in 1992, to elect members of the Rajya Sabha, Indian Parliament's upper chamber. 23 members from 8 states were elected

Elections
Elections were held in 1992 to elect members from various states.
The list is incomplete.

Members elected
The following members are elected in the elections held in 1992. They are members for the term 1992-98 and retire in year 1998, except in case of the resignation or death before the term.

State - Member - Party

Bye-elections
The following bye elections were held in the year 1992.

State - Member - Party

 Bihar - - - INC (  ele  02/03/1992 term till 1994 )

References

1992 elections in India
1992